Eric Ogden (23 August 1923 – 5 May 1997) was a British Labour Party politician.

Early life
Eric Ogden was a miner and studied at the Wigan and District Mining and Technical College.

Political career
He served as a Liverpool Borough Councillor for the ward of Croxteth from 1959 to his selection as the parliamentary candidate for West Derby. He was selected by over 80% of the West Derby constituency party to stand for election he defeated future MP Robert Parry.

He was originally elected Labour Member of Parliament (MP) for Liverpool West Derby at the 1964 general election and served his constituency until deselected in June 1981. He was among the Labour MPs who defected to the new Social Democratic Party in October 1981.  At the 1983 general election, he sought re-election but came third with 18% of the vote while the Labour candidate Robert Wareing won. It was a time of intense political change and Eric no longer thought that the party he joined was any longer true to the political principles he believed in. He was a member of the Stamps Advisory Committee and Chairman of the Falkland Islands Association (he visited the Islands on at least three separate occasions before and after the Falklands War).

Personal life
He enjoyed photography and gardening and was a keen independent traveller. He married twice and had a son by his first wife and two sons by his second wife, Marjorie Ogden, who died on 24 March 2010.

References
Times Guide to the House of Commons, Times Newspapers Limited, 1983 edition.
Whitaker's Almanack, HMSO, 1998 edition.

External links 
 

1923 births
1997 deaths
Labour Party (UK) MPs for English constituencies
National Union of Mineworkers-sponsored MPs
Social Democratic Party (UK) MPs for English constituencies
UK MPs 1964–1966
UK MPs 1966–1970
UK MPs 1970–1974
UK MPs 1974
UK MPs 1974–1979
UK MPs 1979–1983
Members of the Parliament of the United Kingdom for Liverpool constituencies